Michael Pearman (born 1941), is a male retired weightlifter who competed for England and Great Britain.

Weightlifting career
He competed at three Olympic Games in 1964, 1968 and 1972.

He represented England and won a bronze medal in 82.5 kg division, at the 1966 British Empire and Commonwealth Games in Kingston, Jamaica,

Four years later he represented England, at the 1970 British Commonwealth Games in Edinburgh, Scotland and won a second Commonwealth medal eight years after his first, when he won another bronze medal at the 1974 British Commonwealth Games in Christchurch, New Zealand.

References

1941 births
English male weightlifters
British male weightlifters
Commonwealth Games bronze medallists for England
Weightlifters at the 1966 British Empire and Commonwealth Games
Weightlifters at the 1970 British Commonwealth Games
Weightlifters at the 1974 British Commonwealth Games
Olympic weightlifters of Great Britain
Weightlifters at the 1964 Summer Olympics
Weightlifters at the 1968 Summer Olympics
Weightlifters at the 1972 Summer Olympics
Living people
Commonwealth Games medallists in weightlifting
Medallists at the 1966 British Empire and Commonwealth Games
Medallists at the 1974 British Commonwealth Games